A guéridon is a small table supported by one or more columns, or sculptural human or mythological figures, often with a circular top. The guéridon originated in France towards the middle of the 17th century. The supports for early guéridons were often modeled on ancient Egyptian and Greek as well as various African human traditional figures (inspired by caryatids).

While often serving humble purposes, such as to hold a candlestick or vase, the guéridon could be a high-style decorative piece of court furniture. By the time of Louis XIV's death in 1715, there were several hundred guéridons at Versailles, and within a generation they had taken on a nearly endless number of forms: columns, tripods, termini and mythological figures. Some of the simpler and more artistic forms were of wood carved with familiar decorative motives and gilded. Silver, enamel, and indeed almost any material from which furniture can be made have been used for their construction. A variety of small occasional tables (those with no particular function) are now called guéridons in French.

Notes

References 

 Abbott, James A. A Frenchman in Camelot: The Decoration of the Kennedy White House by Stéphane Boudin. Boscobel Restoration Inc.: 1995. .
 Kenny, Peter M., Frances F. Bretter and Ulrich Leben. Honoré Lannuier Cabinetmaker from Paris: The Life and Work of French Ébiniste in Federal New York. The Metropolitan Museum of Art, New York and Harry Abrams: 1998. .
 Monkman, Betty C. The White House: The Historic Furnishing & First Families. Abbeville Press: 2000. .

Furniture
Tables (furniture)